The VESA Enhanced Video Connector (EVC) is a VESA standard that was intended to reduce the number of cables around a computer by incorporating video, audio, FireWire and USB into a single cable system, terminating in a 35-pin Molex MicroCross connector. The intent was to make the monitor the central point of connection. The EVC physical standard was ratified in November 1994, and the pinout and signaling standard followed one year later.

History
The Video Electronic Standards Association (VESA) began working on a successor to the VGA connector for analog video and released the EVC physical standard in November 1994, followed by a pinout and signal standard in November 1995. After the P&D standard was released in June 1997, revisions to the EVC standards were issued in November 1997.

EVC was used for few products, perhaps most commonly found on the HP9000 B/C/J-class workstations introduced in 1997. Although EVC did not find favour with computer manufacturers, it evolved into the somewhat more popular VESA Plug and Display (P&D) standard using a physically identical 35-pin interface with a different shell, capable of transmitting video (both analog and digital) and data. Digital Visual Interface (DVI, 1999), essentially a modified version of P&D stripped of the data signals with higher maximum resolution by adding a second, three-pair digital video channel, would become the industry standard for digital video connections and achieved widespread implementation.

Technical
A VESA EVC connector is capable of carrying analog video (VGA-based) output, video input (composite or S-video), FireWire, analog stereo audio (input and output), and USB signals. Analog video is carried by the C1–C4 pins surrounding the C5 crossed ground plane; this was a development of the 13W3 connector, which was typically fitted to high-end workstations and had three miniature coaxial terminals embedded in the connector. The quasi-coaxial "MicroCross" developed by Molex provided comparable shielding performance with a simpler assembly. The physical arrangement of the EVC pins is identical to the newer VESA Plug and Display (P&D), which carries digital video over the pins used in EVC to carry analog audio (input and output) and video input. The connectors can be distinguished by the shape of the shell: the shell of the EVC connector is shaped like an isosceles trapezoid, similar to the shell of a D-subminiature connector, while the P&D connector instead has a "D"-shaped shell, similar to a DVI connector.

The updated EVC standards in 1997 gave it the alternate name P&D-A, linking it to the P&D family of connectors, which had been released earlier that year and specified an analog & digital video connector (P&D-A/D) and a digital-only video connector (P&D-D).

See also
 HDI-45 connector, a proprietary standard developed contemporaneously by Apple, also intended to consolidate multiple cables

References

 VESA Enhanced Video Connector from the PCMAG.com encyclopedia. Includes an image of how the idea was intended to work
Enhanced Video Connector pinout info

Enhanced Video Connector
VESA